Colditz is a two-part 2005 television drama miniseries, based on the book Colditz: The Definitive History by Henry Chancellor, and the Channel 4 television series Escape from Colditz. It is not claimed to be historically accurate. It features an ensemble cast headlined by Damian Lewis and Sophia Myles and was directed by Stuart Orme. The screenplay was written by Peter Morgan and Richard Cottan.

Synopsis
The series tells several stories of various, mostly British, prisoners of war in the Second World War and their attempts to escape Colditz. The first episode features a fictionalised account of an actual event when three inmates Dick Lorraine, John 'Bosun' Crisp, and the 'Medium Sized Man', Flt Lt Dominic Bruce OBE MC AFM KSG MA RAF attempted to escape using the castle sewers. In reality the escape team were discovered when they attempted to exit a manhole. The Germans threatened to throw grenades down into the sewer chamber and, as the escapees could not reverse back up the sewer pipe, they were forced to surrender. They were immediately put in front of a firing squad, but unlike the fictional TV account, the guards did not fire. Just before the order was to be given, Bruce lost his temper and approached the officer in charge, Eggers, saying "you can shoot us, but after the war we'll hang you". Eggers stood the squad down. An account of this escape can be found in Reel Five of the oral history version given by Flt. Lt. Bruce to be found in the Imperial War Museum Sound Archive.

Cast
 Damian Lewis – Cpl. / Lt. Nicholas McGrade
 Tom Hardy – 2nd Lt. Jack Rose
 Sophia Myles – Lizzie Carter
 Laurence Fox – Capt. Tom Willis
 James Fox – Lt. Colonel Jimmy Fordham
 Timothy West – Bunny Warren
 Jason Priestley – Flying Officer Rhett Barker
 Guy Henry – Capt. Edward Sawyer
 Robert Whitelock – Flt. Lt. Venning
 Charles Kay – Colonel Henry Cartwright, Military Attaché in Switzerland
 Juliet Howland – Mary
 Scott Handy – Mullan
 Alex Avery – Collins
 Eve Myles – Jill
 Robert Cambrinus – Tony de Jongh
 Charles Edwards – Ellways (MI9 Officer)

Release
As of November 2010, Colditz has been released on DVD and Blu-ray in Region 1 and on DVD in Region 2.

Awards
In 2006, it won the BAFTA Television Craft Award for best sound design in a fiction or entertainment.

See also
Oflag IV-C#Television and TV movies

References

External links
 
 Images from Colditz at Movie Screenshots
 Review at eyeforfilm.co.uk
 Review at videovista.net

2005 British television series debuts
2005 British television series endings
2000s British drama television series
2000s British television miniseries
ITV television dramas
English-language television shows
Television series based on actual events
Television series by ITV Studios
Television shows written by Peter Morgan
World War II television drama series
British prison television series
Television shows produced by Granada Television